Hobson is a city in Judith Basin County, Montana, United States. The population was 179 at the 2020 census.

As the freight-wagon crossing of the Judith River between Fort Benton and the Musselshell River country, this community was once known as the “Gateway to the Judith Basin.” In 1881 the post office opened under the name Philbrook. In 1908, however, the Great Northern Railway’s Billings and Northern branch line established another town 4 miles west. After some dispute the railroad decided on the town name Hobson, after the owner of the new townsite.

Geography
Hobson is located at  (46.999321, -109.872347). It is located off of U.S. Route 87

Climate
The Köppen Climate system classifies the weather as semi-arid, abbreviated as BSk.
<div style="width:75%;">

Demographics

2010 census
As of the census of 2010, there were 215 people, 98 households, and 63 families residing in the city. The racial makeup of the city was 98.1% White and 1.9% Native American. Hispanic or Latino of any race were 0.5% of the population.

There were 98 households, of which 25.5% had children under the age of 18 living with them, 50.0% were married couples living together, 11.2% had a female householder with no husband present, 3.1% had a male householder with no wife present, and 35.7% were non-families. 29.6% of all households were made up of individuals, and 15.3% had someone living alone who was 65 years of age or older. The average household size was 2.19 and the average family size was 2.70.

The median age in the city was 48.4 years. 21.4% of residents were under the age of 18; 4.6% were between the ages of 18 and 24; 20.4% were from 25 to 44; 27.9% were from 45 to 64; and 25.6% were 65 years of age or older. The gender makeup of the city was 46.5% male and 53.5% female.

2000 census
As of the census of 2000, there were 244 people, 108 households, and 77 families residing in the city. The population density was 971.0 people per square mile (376.8/km2). There were 128 housing units at an average density of 509.4 per square mile (197.7/km2). The racial makeup of the city was 99.18% White and 0.82% Native American. Hispanic or Latino of any race were 0.41% of the population.

There were 108 households, out of which 25.9% had children under the age of 18 living with them, 59.3% were married couples living together, 10.2% had a female householder with no husband present, and 27.8% were non-families. 25.0% of all households were made up of individuals, and 10.2% had someone living alone who was 65 years of age or older. The average household size was 2.26 and the average family size was 2.71.

In the city the population was spread out, with 24.6% under the age of 18, 3.3% from 18 to 24, 19.3% from 25 to 44, 34.0% from 45 to 64, and 18.9% who were 65 years of age or older. The median age was 46 years. For every 100 females there were 89.1 males. For every 100 females age 18 and over, there were 97.8 males.

The median income for a household in the city was $30,179, and the median income for a family was $35,139. Males had a median income of $21,750 versus $13,750 for females. The per capita income for the city was $15,002. About 19.2% of families and 20.7% of the population were below the poverty line, including 33.8% of those under the age of eighteen and 13.5% of those 65 or over.

In popular culture
Several scenes of the 1974 released movie, Thunderbolt and Lightfoot starring Clint Eastwood and Jeff Bridges were filmed in Hobson, Montana. These scenes were shot in the summer of 1973 in the St. John's Lutheran Church, the adjacent wheat field and in the Black Bull Bar & Steakhouse.

Hobson Church Found
Follow-up to the article in the Reflections, Dec. 2010 Issue
St. John’s Lutheran Church in Hobson, built in 1916 and closed in 1971, had been donated to another LCMS church across the state, only to disappear before it could make the 400 mile journey. But at least some of it made it at least 100 miles out of Hobson.
Rev. Arlo Pullmann, the pastor at St. John in Lau-rel, remembers stories of his grandfather, who, along with other workers on the Great Northern Railway, bought land in Glacier Park and built cabins there. When his grandfather died, the Pullmann family was required to sell the land back to the Park Service. The cabin was dismantled and rebuilt in the Little Belt Mountains.
Only a couple hours away, in Hobson, a couple was dismantling the St. John Church. The wood was sold and then used as flooring in the cabin, and somehow Marj Pullmann, Rev. Pullmann’s mother, ended up with the offering plates. From there she donated them to the District Office, only to be discovered by the district secretary, searching for answers on what happened to St. John’s church in Hobson.

Education
Hobson Public School educates students from kindergarten through 12th grade. Hobson is part of the Tri-City sports coop with Moore and Judith Gap. Hobson High School is a Class C school (less than 108 students) which helps determine athletic competitions.

References

Cities in Judith Basin County, Montana
Cities in Montana